Millennium is the second studio album by death metal band Monstrosity, released in 1996 and produced by Scott Burns. This is the last album to feature George "Corpsegrinder" Fisher on vocals, as he went on to join the death metal band Cannibal Corpse.  It was released on Conquest Music, Inc worldwide and licensed to Nuclear Blast for a European release.  It was later licensed by Hammerheart Records (Netherlands) and re-released in the early 2000s for Europe.

Musical style
Millennium showcases a more technical approach to death metal than on their previous release, Imperial Doom. The guitar work in particular is massively improved from their debut. It features many dynamic changes including quick jumps from tremolo picking to lightning fast playing of power chords, and is perceived by many to be a landmark in technical death metal.

Track listing

Personnel
Monstrosity
George "Corpsegrinder" Fisher – vocals
Jason "Tux" Morgan – guitars
Kelly Conlon – bass
Lee Harrison – drums
Additional musicians
Jason Avery – backing vocals on track 2, 4, 5 and 7
Production
Scott Burns – mixing, producer, recording
Keith Rose – mixing
Scott Kieklak – mixing

References

Monstrosity (band) albums
1996 albums
Albums produced by Scott Burns (record producer)